Kumkapı (meaning 'sand gate' in Turkish) is a quarter in Fatih district of Istanbul. It is located along the northern shore of Marmara Sea. Up to recent times, Kumkapı is the center of the Armenian community of the city, boasting a school and several churches. It is also where the seat of the Armenian Patriarchate of Constantinople is located. The quarter is famous for its many fish restaurants; therefore attracting many local and foreign tourists round the year.

History 
In the Byzantine period, the area was known in Greek as Kontoskàlion.

Transportation 
Earlier Kumkapı had a station on the suburban railway line Sirkeci-Halkalı but that station was permanently closed when Marmaray opened in 2013. Kumkapı is also easily accessible by sea.

See also 
 Kum Kapu demonstration
 List of restaurant districts and streets
 Armenians in Turkey
 List of Armenian ethnic enclaves

Armenian communities in Turkey
Quarters in Istanbul
Restaurant districts and streets in Turkey
Fishing communities in Turkey
Fatih